Omar Abdul Rahman may refer to:

Omar Abdel-Rahman (1938–2017), Egyptian leader of militant group, Al-Gama'a al-Islamiyya
Omar Abdul Rahman (academic) (born 1932), Malaysian academician
Omar Abdulrahman (born 1991), Emirati footballer